Atkinson Hill was born in Pennsylvania about 1755. He was the first Judge of Nelson County, Kentucky. He married Elizabeth Goodin.

References
 http://history.ky.gov/pdf/Publications/Ancestors_v39n3_pt1.pdf

1755 births
American judges
County judges in Kentucky
People of colonial Pennsylvania
Year of death missing
People of pre-statehood Kentucky